Aaron Gate (born 26 November 1990) is a New Zealand road and track cyclist, who currently rides for UCI Continental team . He represented his country in track cycling at the 2012, 2016 and 2020 Summer Olympics. Gate is the first New Zealand athlete to win four gold medals at a single Commonwealth Games.

Career
He won a bronze medal at the 2012 Summer Olympics in the team pursuit event with teammates Sam Bewley, Marc Ryan, Jesse Sergent and Westley Gough. On 24 February 2013 in Belarus, Gate won the world championship title in the omnium event. Alongside Pieter Bulling, Regan Gough, and Dylan Kennett, he came fourth in the men's team pursuit at the 2016 Rio Olympics, being beaten by Denmark to the bronze medal. He was named in the startlist for the 2017 Vuelta a España. In 2021 he won his first national title winning the New Zealand National Time Trial Championships by 0.7 seconds ahead of George Bennett.

At the 2020 Summer Olympics, Gate competed in the team pursuit event with teammates Regan Gough, Jordan Kerby and Campbell Stewart. In the bronze medal race against Australia, he crashed after clipping Kerby's rear wheel, fracturing his collarbone. He subsequently withdrew from the rest of the Games, and was replaced by Stewart in the madison and omnium events.

In 2022, at the age of 31, Gate became a quadruple Commonwealth champion when taking gold in the individual pursuit, team pursuit and points race on the track as well as the road race at the 2022 Commonwealth Games in Birmingham.

Major results

Road

2011
 1st Stage 4 Tour of the Murray River
 6th Overall Rás Tailteann
 10th Rund um den Finanzplatz Eschborn-Frankfurt U23
2012
 7th Overall Tour of Wellington
1st Stage 5
2013
 10th Halle–Ingooigem
2015
 4th Rutland–Melton CiCLE Classic
 5th Overall Rás Tailteann
1st  Sprints classification
1st Stages 2 & 5
 6th Overall Ronde de l'Oise
 6th Ronde van Overijssel
2016
 1st  Overall Tour of Southland
1st Stage 5
 1st Lake Taupo Cycle Challenge
 6th Overall Rás Tailteann
1st  Points classification
1st Stage 6
2018
 1st  Mountains classification, Tour of Austria
2019
 1st  Overall New Zealand Cycle Classic
1st Stage 1
 1st Stage 1 Belgrade–Banja Luka
 5th Overall Circuit des Ardennes
 9th Antwerp Port Epic
2020
 1st  Overall Tour of Southland
1st Stage 1 (TTT), 6 & 7
 2nd Overall New Zealand Cycle Classic
1st Stage 1
2021
 1st  Time trial, National Championships
 1st Gravel and Tar Classic
 3rd Overall New Zealand Cycle Classic
 4th Chrono des Nations
 10th Lillehammer GP
2022
 Commonwealth Games
 1st  Road race
 4th Time trial
 Oceania Championships
1st  Time trial
9th Road race
 1st  Overall International Tour of Hellas
1st Stage 1
 4th Overall Ronde de l'Oise
 9th Overall Tour de Luxembourg
1st Stage 3
 10th Overall Tour of Belgium
 10th Polynormande
2023
 1st  Time trial, National Championships

Grand Tour general classification results timeline

Track

2008
 3rd  Team pursuit, UCI World Junior Championships
2009
 Oceania Championships
2nd  Team pursuit
3rd  Madison
 3rd Team pursuit, UCI World Cup, Pekin
2010
 Oceania Championships
2nd  Madison
2nd  Team pursuit
3rd  Omnium
 UCI World Cup
2nd Madison (with Myron Simpson), Melbourne
2nd Team pursuit, Manchester
2011
 Oceania Championships
1st  Team pursuit
2nd  Points race
 UCI World Cup
1st Team pursuit, Cali
3rd Team pursuit, London
2012
 1st  Scratch race, National Championships
 3rd  Team pursuit, Olympic Games
 3rd  Team pursuit, UCI World Championships
2013
 1st  Omnium, UCI World Championships
 Oceania Championships
1st  Team pursuit
2nd  Omnium
3rd  Madison
 National Championships
1st  Points race
1st  Scratch race
1st  Individual pursuit
1st  Madison (with Myron Simpson)
 3rd Omnium, UCI World Cup, Manchester
2014
 Oceania Championships
1st  Points race
2nd  Team pursuit
3rd  Omnium
 3rd  Team pursuit, UCI World Championships
 3rd  Points race, Commonwealth Games
2015
 Oceania Championships
1st  Points race
1st  Team pursuit
2nd  Omnium
 1st  Omnium, National Championships
2016
 Oceania Championships
1st  Omnium
2nd  Points race
 1st  Points race, National Championships
2017
 2nd  Omnium, UCI World Championships
2018
 1st Madison (with Campbell Stewart), UCI World Cup, Cambridge
2019
 UCI World Cup
1st Omnium, Brisbane
1st Madison (with Campbell Stewart), Cambridge
2nd Madison (with Tom Sexton), Brisbane
3rd Team pursuit, Cambridge
2020
 National Championships
1st  Omnium
1st  Individual pursuit
1st  Madison (with Campbell Stewart)
 UCI World Championships
2nd  Madison (with Campbell Stewart)
2nd  Team pursuit
2021
 National Championships
1st  Points race
1st  Individual pursuit
 2nd  Omnium, UCI World Championships
 UCI Champions League
2nd Elimination race, Panevėžys
2nd Elimination race, London
2022
 Commonwealth Games
1st  Team pursuit
1st  Individual pursuit
1st  Points race
 Oceania Championships
1st  Individual pursuit
1st  Points race
1st  Scratch race
1st  Omnium
2nd  Madison
 3rd  Omnium, UCI World Championships

References

External links

Cyclists at the 2012 Summer Olympics
Cyclists at the 2016 Summer Olympics
Cyclists at the 2020 Summer Olympics
Olympic cyclists of New Zealand
Olympic bronze medalists for New Zealand
1990 births
Living people
Olympic medalists in cycling
New Zealand male cyclists
Cyclists at the 2010 Commonwealth Games
UCI Track Cycling World Champions (men)
Cyclists from Auckland
Cyclists at the 2014 Commonwealth Games
Medalists at the 2012 Summer Olympics
Commonwealth Games medallists in cycling
Commonwealth Games bronze medallists for New Zealand
New Zealand track cyclists
Cyclists at the 2022 Commonwealth Games
Commonwealth Games competitors for New Zealand
Commonwealth Games gold medallists for New Zealand
20th-century New Zealand people
21st-century New Zealand people
Medallists at the 2014 Commonwealth Games
Medallists at the 2022 Commonwealth Games